This is a list of historic filling stations and service stations, including a few tire service stations which did not have gas pumps.  A number of these in the United States are listed on the National Register of Historic Places.

They are of various architectural types including "house" types.

Canada
Joy Gas Stations
Nuns' Island gas station

Denmark
Palægaragerne
Skovshoved Petrol Station

Eritrea
Fiat Tagliero Building

United Kingdom
East Sheen Filling Station
Markham Moor service area
Red Hill filling station

United States

Arizona
John Osterman Gas Station, Peach Springs
Cave Creek Service Station, Cave Creek
J.H. Smith Grocery Store and Filling Station, Dragoon
Copeland & Tracht Service Station, Phoenix

Arkansas
Harvey's Grocery and Texaco Station, in Camden, Arkansas
Allen Tire Company and Gas Station, Prescott
Texaco Station No. 1, Paragould
Wittsburg Store and Gas Station, Wittsburg
Ferguson Gas Station, Marshall
Jameson-Richards Gas Station, Bald Knob
Walter Patterson Filling Station, Clinton
Roundtop Filling Station, Sherwood
Langdon Filling Station, Hot Springs
Magnolia Company Filling Station, Fayetteville (NRHP-listed in 1978)
Magnolia Petroleum Company Filling Station, Kingsland (NRHP-listed in 2019)
Ellis Building, Fayetteville
Marathon Oil Service Station, Fordyce
Gulf Oil Company Service Station, Paragould
Henry W. Klotz, Sr., Service Station, Russell
Mount Ida Cities Service Filling Station, Mount Ida
Wallace Adams Service Station, Texarkana
Lee Service Station, Damascus
Price Produce and Service Station, Springdale
Rison Cities Service Station, Rison
Rison Texaco Service Station, Rison
Samuel P. Taylor Service Station, Little Rock
Troy Lasater Service Station, New Blaine
Murfreesboro Cities Service Station, Murfreesboro
Gulf Oil Company Filling Station, Stamps

California
Shell Gas Station, La Grange

District of Columbia
Embassy Gulf Service Station, Washington

Florida

Atlantic Gas Station, Miami
Standard Oil Service Station, Plant City

Georgia
Pure Oil Service Station (Hartwell, Georgia)
Pure Oil Service Station (Lavonia, Georgia)
Gulf Oil Company service station, Douglasville, in Tudor Revival, from 1920s, in [[Douglasville Commercial Historic District]
4. 1940 Sinclair Service Station Lavonia, GA

Illinois
Ambler's Texaco Gas Station, Dwight
Pure Oil Station, Geneva
Belvidere Cafe, Motel and Gas Station, Litchfield
Soulsby Service Station, Mount Olive
Standard Oil Gasoline Station (Odell, Illinois)
Standard Oil Gasoline Station (Plainfield, Illinois)
Shea's Gas Station Museum, Springfield

Indiana
Hy-Red Gasoline Station, Greentown
Firestone Tire and Rubber Store, Evansville, IN (to be verified about providing auto service or not)

Iowa
Bedford Oil Company Station, Bedford
Kreinbring Phillips 66 Gas Station, Lowden
Master Service Station (Waterloo, Iowa)
Pioneer Oil Company Filling Station, Grinnell
Henry and Johanna Van Maren House-Diamond Filling Station, Pella
Wolters Filling Station, Davenport

Kansas
Hughes Conoco Service Station, Topeka
Westside Service Station and Riverside Motel, Eureka
Baxter Springs Independent Oil and Gas Service Station, Baxter Springs
Deerfield Texaco Service Station, Deerfield
E. W. Norris Service Station, Glen Elder

Kentucky
Spur Gasoline Station, Cynthiana
Standard Oil Company Filling Station, Bowling Green

Louisiana
More Mileage Gas Station, Jennings

Massachusetts
Colonial Beacon Gas Station, Stoneham
A. C. Smith & Co. Gas Station, Quincy

Michigan
Tuomy Hills Service Station, Ann Arbor

Minnesota
Lindholm Oil Company Service Station, Cloquet
Lundring Service Station, Canby
Midway Service Station, Kenna
New Ulm Oil Company Service Station, New Ulm

Missouri
Gardner and Tinsley Filling Station, New Cambria
Royal Tire Service Inc. Building, St. Louis, MO (to be verified about providing auto service or not)

Montana
Dave's Texaco, Chinook, Montana
Continental Oil Company Filling Station, Kalispell
Hale's Filling Station and Grocery, Bainville
H. Earl Clack Service Station, Saco

Nebraska
Gloe Brothers Service Station, Wood River
Standard Oil Red Crown Service Station, Ogallala
Weyl Service Station, Trenton
Shady Bend Gas Station, Grocery, and Diner, Grand Island
Warner's Filling Station and House, Geneva

New Mexico
Roy T. Herman's Garage and Service Station, Thoreau
Huning Highlands Conoco Service Station, Albuquerque
Otero's 66 Service, Los Lunas
Charley's Automotive Service, Grants
Grants-Milan Flight Service Station, Grants

New York
Pure Oil Gas Station, Saratoga Springs
Liebler-Rohl Gasoline Station, Lancaster

North Carolina
Shell Service Station (Winston-Salem, North Carolina) 
Beam's Shell Service Station and Office, (Former), Cherryville

North Dakota
Westland Oil Filling Station, Minot

Oklahoma
Foyil Filling Station, Foyil, in Rogers County
Marland Filling Station, Hominy
McDougal Filling Station, Vinita
Seaba's Filling Station, Chandler
Threatt Filling Station, Luther
Narcissa D-X Gas Station, Miami
Avant's Cities Service Station, El Reno
Bridgeport Hill Service Station, Geary
Bristow Firestone Service Station, Bristow
Canute Service Station, Canute
Cities Service Station, Afton
Cities Service Station No. 8, Tulsa
Jackson Conoco Service Station, El Reno
Magnolia Service Station, Texola
Miami Marathon Oil Company Service Station, Miami
Provine Service Station, Hydro
Sayre Champlin Service Station, Sayre
Sinclair Service Station (Tulsa, Oklahoma)
Spraker Service Station, Vinita
Texaco Service Station (Bristow, Oklahoma)
Y Service Station and Cafe, Clinton
Bristow Tire Shop, Bristow, OK, which is a former service station that did have gas pumps
Randall Tire Company, Vinita, OK

Oregon
St. Johns Signal Tower Gas Station, Portland
Peck Bros. and Bartle Tire Service Company Building, Portland, Oregon, which serviced automobiles but does not appear to have had gas pumps

Pennsylvania
Lee Tire and Rubber Company, Conshohocken, PA  (to be verified about providing auto service or not)

Rhode Island
Art's Auto (1927), Pawtucket

South Carolina
ESSO Club, Clemson

South Dakota
Spearfish Filling Station, Spearfish

Tennessee
Spring Street Service Station, McMinnville
Airplane Service Station, Knoxville
Ellis Service Station Garage, Nashville

Texas
Old Sinclair Station, Bryan, Texas
Schauer Filling Station, Houston
Jenkins-Harvey Super Service Station and Garage, Tyler
Texas Company Filling Station, Victoria
1928 Phillips 66 Service Station, Turkey, Texas (see photo above for description)

Utah
Utah Parks Company Service Station, Bryce Canyon
River Heights Sinclair Station, River Heights

Vermont
Gas Station at Bridge and Island Streets, Rockingham

Washington
Central Service Station, Rosalia
Teapot Dome Service Station, Zillah

West Virginia
Weaver's Antique Service Station, Burlington

Wisconsin
Trapp Filling Station, Hartland
Oatman Filling Station, Eau Claire
Freitag's Pure Oil Service Station, Monroe
Wadhams Gas Station, West Allis

See also
Filling station
List of filling station chains in North America

Notes

References

Car-related lists